"Nothing but Love (Standing in the Way)" is a song recorded by Canadian country music group The Wilkinsons. It was released in 1999 as the fifth single from their debut album, Nothing but Love. It peaked at number 12 on the RPM Country Tracks chart in November 1999.

Chart performance

Year-end charts

References

1999 singles
The Wilkinsons songs
Giant Records (Warner) singles
Songs written by Gary Burr
Song recordings produced by Doug Johnson (record producer)
1999 songs